John Wilbur Parkin (April 10. 1918 – June 4, 2003) was an American businessman and politician.

Biography
Parkin was born on April 10, 1918 in Rochester, Minnesota and went to Rochester High School. He went to University of Minnesota. Parkin moved to Marshfield, Wisconsin and was involved in his family business: the Parkin Ice Cream Company. He served on the Wood County, Wisconsin Board of Supervisors and was chairman of the county board. He served in the Wisconsin Assembly in 1969 and 1970 and was a Republican. Parkin moved to Atlanta, Georgia and lived at King's Bridge Retirement Community. He died in Atlanta, Georgia.

References

External links

Politicians from Rochester, Minnesota
Politicians from Atlanta
People from Marshfield, Wisconsin
County supervisors in Wisconsin
Republican Party members of the Wisconsin State Assembly
University of Minnesota alumni
1918 births
2003 deaths
20th-century American politicians